Liam Bowe (born 23 September 1997) is an Australian cricketer. He made his Twenty20 (T20) debut for Melbourne Stars in the 2016–17 Big Bash League season on 10 January 2017.

Bowe opts to play in glasses rather than contact lenses in the field. Due to this and a good debut match, he was affectionately nicknamed "cricket's Harry Potter" by fans, later adopting the nickname "The Wizard". This nickname, as well as the use of his glasses, saw him established as a cult hero immediately after his debut.

References

External links
 

1997 births
Living people
Australian cricketers
Melbourne Stars cricketers
Sydney Thunder cricketers
Place of birth missing (living people)